Fire Water Paper: A Vietnam Oratorio is a large scale orchestral oratorio composed by Elliot Goldenthal, commissioned by the Pacific Symphony in 1993 for the 20th Anniversary of the end of the Vietnam War.

The album
It was performed publicly and recorded in mid 1995 and released commercially in 1996. Yo-Yo Ma performed Solo Cello on "Part I"; other performers include: The Pacific Chorale & Children's Chorus, the Ngan-Khoi Vietnamese Children's Choir, Ann Panagulias and James Maddalena; it was conducted by Carl St. Clair.

It is not considered an archetypal oratorio as it doesn't tell a story so much as it brings together many different poems and words of praise, the latter adding a sort of religious aspect in the form of requiem.

Track listing
 Part I: Offertorium (32:08)
 Part II: Scherzo (giằng co) (14:14)
 Part III: Hymn (19:19)

Crew and performers
 Music Composed by Elliot Goldenthal
 Produced by Steven Epstein
 Performed by Yo-Yo Ma, Solo Cello (Part I)
 Ann Panagulias, Soprano & James Maddalena, Baritone
 Pacific Chorale & Children's Chorus
 Ngan-Khoi Vietnamese Children's Chorus
 Pacific Symphony Orchestra, Conducted by Carl St. Clair
 Engineer: Richard King

References

External links
 https://web.archive.org/web/20070817004514/http://goldenthal.filmmusic.com/concert/firewaterpaper/index.html – The page for the album on the composer's website.

Compositions by Elliot Goldenthal
Oratorios
1993 compositions
1996 classical albums
Elliot Goldenthal albums
Vietnam War in popular culture
Music commissioned by the Pacific Symphony